Gandeed is a Mandal in Mahabubnagar district in the state of Telangana in India.

It further have many villages mainly Nancherla, Gadrial, Rusumpally, Mohammadabad (which is supposed to be declared as an independent new mandal very soon)

Geography 
The name of the village was originally Gandi veedu. But, in the long run, it changed to Gandeed.

This area is very much required its development by the Govt. of A.P in terms of every aspect, because it exists border to Karnataka and ignored by the leaders & the Govt.,  Because of the people's innocence as they never raises their voice on developmental activities against Govt./Leaders.
- S.Baswaraj, Gandeed

The following is the list of village panchayats in Gandeed mandal.
Rususmpally
Reddypally
Gandeed
Komreddypally
Mansurpally
Pagidyal
Varahagiripally
Salkarpet
Baispally
Balsurgonda
Gadiryal
Lingaipally
Nancharla
Mangampet
Mokarlabad
Chowderpally
Mohammadabad
Annareddypally
Julapally
Sangaipally
Kaplapur
Vennached
Pedda warwal
Chinna warwal
Salarnagar
Chelmilla
Jinnaram
Venkatreddypally
Kanchanpally

References 

Mandals in Mahbubnagar district